The 2011–12 Republika Srpska Cup was a tournament organized by the Football Association of Republika Srpska.

FK Borac Banja Luka ended up beating FK Sloboda Mrkonjić Grad in the final. That was the club's  5th cup title.

Round of 32

Round of 16

External links
 Football Association of Republika Srpska

Republika Srpska Cup
Republika Srpska Cup